The Curse of Belphegor (French: La malédiction de Belphégor, Italian: La mortale trappola di Belfagor) is a 1967 film directed by Georges Combret and Jean Maley and starring Paul Guers, Raymond Souplex and Dominique Boschero.

Plot

Cast
 Paul Guers as Fred Daxo  
 Raymond Souplex as Inspecteur Legris  
 Dominique Boschero as Nadia  
 Raymond Bussières as Plumme  
 Achille Zavatta as Hubert  
 Noëlle Noblecourt as Claude, la journaliste  
 Maurice Chevit as Garnier  
 Marcel Charvey as Olivier  
 Annette Poivre as Mme Plumme  
 Jean Daurand as Lefèvre  
 Maurice Sarfati as Roger  
 Jean Maley as Marc  
 Lydia Zavatta

Release
The Curse of Belphegor was distributed in France by Europrodis on 8 November 1967. It was distributed in Italy by Indipendenti Regionali.

References

Bibliography

External links

The Curse of Belphegor at Variety Distribution

1967 films
Italian horror thriller films
French horror thriller films
1960s French-language films
Films directed by Georges Combret
1960s French films
1960s Italian films